The Secret of Sinharat is a science fantasy novel by American writer Leigh Brackett, set on the planet Mars, whose protagonist is Eric John Stark. The novel is expanded from the novella "Queen of the Martian Catacombs", published in the pulp magazine Planet Stories in the Summer 1949 issue.

Plot summary

For the first seven chapters, Queen of the Martian Catacombs and The Secret of Sinharat are almost word-for-word identical; the differences are inconsequential to the plot. In Chapter 1, a brief paragraph is inserted to situate the reader in the Solar System and to excuse the presence of non-Terran humans on planets like Mars through the concept of a prehistoric "seeding"—not mentioned elsewhere in Brackett's novels. In Chapter 5, an explicit reference to the events of Brackett's story "The Beast-Jewel of Mars" (Planet Stories, Winter 1948) has been cut, perhaps on the assumption that readers of the novel would not know or be interested in the earlier story. The Arabic word "khamsin" is consistently replaced by "storm wind", perhaps on the grounds that readers might not be familiar with the word (or mistake it for a Martian technical term).
 Chapter 1: Eric John Stark, fleeing from Venus where he has been running guns to native opponents of a Terro-Venusian mining concern (mining and mineral extraction companies recur as villains in Brackett's stories), has come to Mars to fight as a mercenary in a private war in the Martian Drylands on behalf of Delgaun, lord of the Martian city of Valkis. He is finally pinned down by agents of Earth Police Control. Their leader, Simon Ashton, offers him a deal: lifting of his sentence, if he agrees to act as a spy on Delgaun, whom Ashton claims is plotting a major war together with a barbarian leader called Kynon, of the Dryland tribe of Shun; a war that Ashton says will be disastrous for the drylanders. Stark agrees to go to Valkis as Ashton's agent, and return to report to him in the Martian city of Tarak.
 Chapter 2: Stark enters Valkis late at night and sees the drylanders gathering there. He meets Delgaun and several other mercenaries that Delgaun has hired. One of them is Luhar, an old enemy of Stark from Venus. They challenge each other, but Delgaun separates them. At dawn, Kynon of Shun enters Valkis.
 Chapter 3: Delgaun, Stark and the mercenaries go to see Kynon. In the public square of Valkis, Kynon demonstrates a technology which he claims to have recovered from the lost secrets of the Ramas, an ancient race of Martians who had acquired a form of immortality. Kynon, using two crystal circlets and a glowing rod, appears to transfer the consciousness of an old Martian man into a young Terran boy. The old man collapses and dies. Kynon returns with Delgaun and the others to the council room in the palace.
 Chapter 4: Stark accuses Kynon of an elaborate charade in which the boy was coached in his part and the old man was killed by poison. Kynon admits it, but justifies it as a necessity for uniting the drylanders against the City-States of the Dryland Borders, who are depriving them of water resources. Together with the men of Valkis and the other Low-canal cities, they will conquer the City-States and become fully independent of Terra. Stark goes to his quarters and sleeps through the day. At dusk he goes to the council-room, and finds Delgaun there with Kynon's female companion, Berild. Delgaun asks Stark to bring back one of Kynon's trusted captains, Freka, who is indulging in "a certain vice"; he needs to be back before Kynon sets out at midnight for his desert headquarters. On his way, Stark is stopped by Fianna, Berild's serving girl, who warns him that he is going into a trap set by Delgaun. Stark accepts the warning, but continues anyway.
 Chapter 5: Stark comes to Kala's, a broken-down dive in a mostly uninhabited part of Valkis. He finds Freka there, indulging in shanga, a radiation-induced temporary atavistic regression to a bestial state. Stark realizes that an empty room near Freka probably contains the trap set for him. When he is refused entrance to the room, he leaves Kala's and waits outside. He is followed by Luhar, who had been waiting in the empty room for a chance to attack Stark. Stark jumps Luhar; the fighting goes back into Kala's, where the shanga addicts and Kala herself become involved. Stark knocks Freka out, is stabbed by Luhar, knocks Luhar out, and returns with Freka to Delgaun's palace. Delgaun is surprised and angry; Berild is pleased.
 Chapter 6: At midnight, Kynon leaves Valkis with the drylanders and mercenaries. Kynon orders Stark and Luhar to remain apart from each other. Delgaun remains behind. Luhar and Freka confer. The caravan proceeds across the desert for three days, and on the fourth day they are hit by a sandstorm.
 Chapter 7: Luhar and Freka take advantage of the storm to jump Stark and leave him for dead. He finds himself together with Berild. When the storm blows out, they are lost in the desert. They proceed on foot. After four days, running out of water, they come to a wilderness of rocks.

From chapter 8 on the two versions diverge.

Queen of the Martian Catacombs 
 Chapter 8: Stark and Berild are dying of thirst. Berild leads Stark three miles out of their way to a ruined monastery. She miraculously discovers a long-buried well. After they have drunk and slept, Stark suggests to Berild that she is actually a surviving immortal Rama, and knew the location of the well from memory. Berild dismisses the accusation. They stay in the ruins two days, and then leave.
 Chapter 9: Stark and Berild arrive at Sinharat, the old city of the Ramas, where Kynon has made his headquarters. They find Kynon's army and his mercenaries camped in the desert outside the city. Stark enters Sinharat looking for Luhar, and fatally attacks him when he finds him. Delgaun is also mysteriously there. Kynon arrests Stark and places him in a subterranean cell in Sinharat under Freka's guard. Before Freka can kill Stark, Fianna appears and shoots him. Stark disposes of Freka in a pit in the catacombs. Fianna explains that Delgaun and Berild are both Ramas, and that while Kynon wants empire, Delgaun and Berild want to control Mars—without Kynon—through their mercenary outlander clients.
 Chapter 10: Stark and Fianna proceed to a crypt below Sinharat where Berild is waiting. Kynon is there with her, but drugged and under Berild's hypnotic control. Berild offers to become Stark's lover and to make him a Rama, by exchanging his mind with Kynon's, and disposing of Delgaun after the war. Stark agrees, and Berild produces the real crowns of the Ramas, and puts them on Stark's and Kynon's heads.
 Chapter 11: Stark awakes to find himself in Kynon's body. His own body is still there, alive but with Kynon's mind still under hypnosis. Berild locks Kynon, in Stark's body, in a small cell. Stark-as-Kynon goes with Berild to address the armies assembled at Sinharat from a high ledge in the city. Delgaun is there. Instead of leading them to war, Stark reveals the charade of the false Rama crowns. Berild stabs Stark in the back. Stark reveals Berild's treachery to Delgaun. Delgaun throws Berild from the ledge and attempts to unseat Stark from his steed and flee. Stark, though wounded, grasps Delgaun and throttles him, while Delgaun stabs him repeatedly. Stark kills Delgaun and loses consciousness. Fianna runs to him.
 Chapter 12: Stark awakes and finds himself with Fianna. He is back in the crypt below Sinharat, in his own body. Kynon is next to him, dead. Fianna reveals that she is also a Rama, unknown to Berild and Delgaun. She expresses remorse for her past evil and destroys the rod and crowns of the Ramas. Stark and Fianna leave together and find Sinharat deserted. Fianna decides to stay in Sinharat for a while before she decides what to do. Stark departs for Tarak to meet Simon Ashton.

The Secret of Sinharat 
 Chapter 8: Stark and Berild are dying of thirst. Berild leads Stark three miles out of their way to an old ruin, where they both collapse. At night, Stark wakes to see Berild tracing her steps to the site of a long-buried well. They uncover it together, drink, and sleep. The next night, Stark suggests to Berild that she must be a witch to have discovered the well. Berild explains that she knew the secret of the well's location from her father, who had crossed the desert in this place years ago. Stark accepts her explanation, but is privately unconvinced. They stay in the ruins two days, and then leave.
 Chapter 9: Stark and Berild arrive at Sinharat at dawn and find Kynon's caravan encamped outside. The Dryland armies have not yet arrived, but only Kynon and his mercenaries are in the city itself, which the drylanders regard as taboo. Stark and Berild enter Sinharat looking for Luhar, but Kynon prevents Stark and Luhar from fighting. Berild kills Luhar with a knife. Kynon does not punish Berild, but warns Stark not to fight with Freka, who has gone back to the desert, and condemns the infighting that threatens his plans. Berild lies to Kynon about how she and Stark reached Sinharat, pretending that they had more water than they did. Kynon dismisses Berild and Stark.
 Chapter 10: Stark awakes at dusk and finds Fianna there. She warns him that his life is in danger from Delgaun, when he arrives. Stark refuses to flee. Fianna leads Stark to a chamber where Berild is waiting. She warns him against Delgaun, and expresses her resentment at Kynon. Drums beat announcing the late arrival of Delgaun and his allies to Sinharat, and Stark and Berild part. As Stark leaves, he meets Fianna, who hints that Berild may be a Rama.
 Chapter 11: Kynon unveils the banner of the Ramas before the massed armies of the Drylands and the Low-canals in front of Sinharat. Stark confronts Delgaun as a fellow-follower of Kynon, and forces Delgaun to accept him as comrade-in-arms. Later, in council, Delgaun backs down before Kynon, and they proceed to plot the conquest of the City-States. Kynon warns his confederates not to reveal that they do not really have the secret of the Ramas. Days pass. Freka returns from Shun with more fighters, but Kynon keeps him and Stark from fighting. Later, Stark goes into Sinharat and finds Berild reading an ancient wall-inscription in an unknown language. Stark follows her as she goes to a high window.
 Chapter 12: Stark accuses Berild of being a Rama. Berild dismisses his statement with smooth explanations, but Stark does not accept them. Stark deduces that Delgaun must also be a Rama. Berild leaves suddenly. Stark goes later, and is attacked by Freka who is under the influence of shanga. As they are fighting, Kynon and his fighters discover them. Stark is accused of murdering Freka, and the Shunni demand his blood. Stark is knocked out as he tries to blurt out the truth of Kynon's charade. He awakes in an underground cell, guarded by a Shunni warrior. (This portion of the expansion is a rewrite of the middle of Chapter 9 of Catacombs.)
 Chapter 13: Fianna appears, shoots the Shunni, and frees Stark. Fianna reveals that she, Berild, and Delgaun are all surviving Ramas, though she is dependent upon them for the Sending-on of Minds. She leads him into the catacombs, where Stark disposes of the guard's body in a pit and takes his sword. Fianna describes Delgaun and Berild's plans for empire, and explains that they intend to dispose of Kynon by putting Delgaun's mind into Kynon's body. She asks Stark to help her prevent it, and leads him to Berild's chamber. There they find Kynon in bonds, and Berild preparing the real crowns of the Ramas for the Sending-on of Minds.
 Chapter 14: Stark enters, attacks Delgaun and kills him with the sword. Berild drops the crowns and draws a knife. Fianna frees Kynon, who throttles Berild as she slashes him. Stark tells the wounded Kynon to stop the march of the Drylanders. He and Fianna help Kynon out to the open stairway that leads up to Sinharat. From there, Kynon addresses the tribes, telling them of Delgaun and Berild's treachery and his own lie about having the secret of the Ramas. Then he collapses and dies. The mercenaries and the armies break up and leave. Stark returns to Sinharat and finds Fianna. She explains that she has hidden the crowns of the Ramas, unable to destroy them. She invites Stark to return to Sinharat late in his life, offering to make him a Rama then. He refuses. Fianna says that she will stay in Sinharat. Stark departs for Tarak to meet Simon Ashton, looking back at Sinharat as he goes.

Characters
Eric John Stark, an outlaw mercenary warrior, born on Mercury, acting as a double agent.
Simon Ashton, an official of Earth Police Control, searching for Stark.
Delgaun of Valkis, lord of the wickedest of the Low-canal cities, hiring mercenaries to serve in a war in the Drylands.
Luhar, cashiered officer of the Venusian Guards, with a deadly grudge against Stark
Kynon of Shun, a Martian dryland barbarian with dreams of uniting the desert tribes and establishing an empire over the City-States of Mars.
Freka, a captain loyal to Kynon, but addicted to the terrible vice of shanga.
Berild, a red-haired Shunni woman, consort of Kynon, but actually using him to further her plans and Delgaun's.
Fianna, Berild's servant girl, possessed of wisdom and cunning far beyond her years.
The Ramas, an ancient and evil Martian nation, who had discovered the secret of immortality - at a terrible price, to be paid by others.

Publication history

This story was first published under the title Queen of the Martian Catacombs in the pulp magazine Planet Stories, Summer 1949.

In 1964, after considerable revision and expansion, it was republished as The Secret of Sinharat as one part of an Ace Double novel; its companion was another expanded Eric John Stark story, People of the Talisman. The expansion has sometimes been attributed to Brackett's husband, Edmond Hamilton. For The Secret of Sinharat, there is little internal evidence to support this suggestion.

In 1982, it appeared, again together with People of the Talisman, under the title Eric John Stark, Outlaw of Mars.

In 2005 the original Planet Stories version was republished in Sea-Kings of Mars and Otherworldly Stories, Volume 46 in the Gollancz Fantasy Masterworks series. It appeared the same year in the collection Stark and the Star Kings (Haffner Press).

In 2008, the entire Eric John Stark saga was republished, in E-Book form, by Baen Publishing, and is available thru Webscriptions.net.

References

Sources

External links

1964 American novels
1964 science fiction novels
1964 fantasy novels
Novels by Leigh Brackett
Novels set on Mars
Works originally published in Planet Stories
Ace Books books
Fiction set on desert planets